Frank Cruz (born 1959) is an American college baseball coach, who most recently served as the head coach of the USC Trojans baseball team.  He held the position from 2011 through 2012.  Cruz was relieved of his duties for "knowingly violating NCAA Countable Athletically-Related Activities limitations" just two days prior to the beginning of the 2013 NCAA Division I baseball season.

Early life
A native of Los Angeles, Cruz graduated from Saint Monica Catholic High School of Santa Monica, California in 1977.

Coaching career
Cruz began coaching at University High in Los Angeles, where he also taught health and physical education.  His teams claimed a city championship and four league crowns.  He then moved to USC, where he was an assistant to Mike Gillespie for four seasons, during which the Trojans appeared in four NCAA Tournaments and reached the 1995 College World Series final.

Loyola Marymount named Cruz head coach in 1997, and he led the Lions to three straight first-place finishes in the West Coast Conference from 1998–2000.  Cruz coached several conference honorees and was named Recruiter of the Year in 1997 by Collegiate Baseball, in part for his assembling the nation's 16th ranked recruiting class that year.  The class included 2000 Major League Baseball Draft 16th overall pick Billy Traber.

In addition to his duties at LMU, Cruz was head coach of USA Baseball's 2004 national team, winning the program's first gold medal at the FISU World University Championships.  He was also an assistant on the 2000 national team.

Following twelve successful years at LMU, Cruz became a volunteer assistant at USC for the 2009 and 2010 seasons under head coach Chad Kreuter.

Cruz was named interim head coach of the Trojans after the 2010 season, and earned the job permanently on May 19, 2011.  He was fired for knowingly exceeding the number of hours of scheduled practices after a weeklong investigation by the USC athletic department.

Head coaching record
The following table records Frank Cruz's record as a collegiate head coach.

References

1959 births
Living people
USC Trojans baseball coaches
Loyola Marymount Lions baseball coaches
Pepperdine University alumni
Place of birth missing (living people)
Sportspeople from Los Angeles